Evelyn Genevieve "Sharpie" Sharp (October 1, 1919 – April 3, 1944) was an American aviator. She was a member of the Women Airforce Service Pilots (WASP). Sharp died at age 24, when the plane she was flying lost an engine during takeoff.

Early life
Sharp was born Lois Genevieve Crouse on October 1, 1919 in Melstone, Montana, to Elsie Adelie Haeske Crouse and Orla Crouse. She was adopted by John and Mary Sharp two months later, on December 22, 1919, and her name was changed to Evelyn Genevieve Sharp.

The Sharps moved to Ord, Nebraska in 1924 and opened a grocery store. In 1928, Orla Sharp purchased a ranch and tried ranching for a time, but within a year sold the ranch and returned to Ord, where he opened a cafe and offered rooms to let.

Introduction to aviation
In 1935, when Sharp was sixteen, Jack Jefford opened a flying school in Ord and rented a room from the Sharps. Unable to pay his rent at one point, he offered to teach Sharp how to fly instead. After 25 lessons over the course of 13 months, she flew solo in an Aeronca C-3 on March 4, 1936.

At age eighteen, she received her commercial pilot's license and acquired her first airplane with the help of local businessmen. Sharp repaid them with money she earned from barnstorming. She became an airplane instructor at age 20. Over 350 men learned to fly under her instruction.

While not the first American female airmail pilot (Katherine Stinson), she was certainly among the first.

World War II

Sharp was one of the original Women's Auxiliary Ferrying Squadron (WAFS) pilots, with over 3,000 flight hours logged when she joined. The WAFS (under Nancy Love) were soon merged with the Women's Flying Training Detachment (under Jacqueline Cochran) to form the Women Airforce Service Pilots (WASP).

Sharp died on April 3, 1944 in Cumberland County, Pennsylvania, when the P-38 Lightning she was ferrying lost an engine on takeoff from New Cumberland Airport and crashed. She was 24 years old.

Legacy
At the time of her death she was a squadron commander, only three flights from her fifth rating, the highest certificate then available to women.

She is buried in Ord, Nebraska, where a public airfield, the Evelyn Sharp Field Airport, has been named for her. Every June, Ord celebrates Evelyn Sharp Days in her honor.

In 1992, Sharp was inducted into the Nebraska Aviation Hall of Fame.

In 2018, a memorial to Sharp was dedicated at the Pfeiffer Memorial Arboretum and Nature Preserve in Cumberland County, Pennsylvania, at the site of the plane crash.

See also
 Women Airforce Service Pilots (WASP)
 United States Army Air Forces

References

External links
Collection of articles about Evelyn Sharp
Texas Women's University profile of Evelyn Sharp
Nebraska Aviation Hall of Fame
National Museum of the USAF biography of Evelyn Sharp

The Ninety-Nines Sharpie: The Life Story of Evelyn Sharp - Nebraska's Aviatrix
Short biography of Evelyn Sharp along with the other 38 women who died, serving as WASP pilots during World War II
Article about memorial dedication at crash site

1919 births
1944 deaths
Accidental deaths in Pennsylvania
United States Army Air Forces personnel killed in World War II
Aviators from Montana
Aviators killed in aviation accidents or incidents in the United States
People from Musselshell County, Montana
People from Ord, Nebraska
United States airmail pilots
Women Airforce Service Pilots personnel